Pierre-René Lemonnier (1731, Paris – 8 January 1796, Metz) was an 18th-century French playwright and librettist.

Works 
1760: Vaudeville des Pèlerins de la Courtille, (parodie des Paladins). N, -B. Duchesne, in-8.
1760: Le Maitre en droit, opéra comique in two acts (and in prose) mingled with ariettes, Duchesne, in-8° ; or Paris, Christophe Ballard, 1762, in-8°.
1761: Le cadi dupé, opéra comique in one act (and in prose) mingled with ariettes. By the author of « Maitre en droit », Duchesne, in-8°.
1764: Les Dieux réunis, ou la Fête des Muses, prologue (in one act and in verse), and le Tuteur amoureux, comedy in two acts and in verse, mingled with ariettes (in French and in Spanish). Madrid, D. Antonio Munoz del Valle, in-4°.
1768: Le Mariage clandestin, comedy in three acts and in free verse, Amsterdam and Paris, Lejay, in-8.(Beuchot erroneously says in the Biographie universelle, that this play, imitated from English by Garrick, was not printed.)
1768: La Meunière de Gentilly, comedy in one act (in prose), mingled with ariettes. Vente, 1768, 1770, in-8°.
1773: L’Union de l’amour et des arts, ballet héroïque en trois entrées, composé des actes de Bathilde et Chloé, de Théodore et de la Cour d’amour (in free verse), Paris, Delormel, 1773, in-4 j or Paris, Bailard, in-8°.
1774: Azolan, ou le Serment indiscret, ballet héroïque in three acts (and in free verse), De Lormel, in-4. (the author reworked this play in 1787 under the titleAlmasis, but it was not printed then.)
1787: Renaud d’Ast, comedy in two acts and in prose, mingled with ariettes. Paris, Brunet, in-8°.
1794: La Matrone chinoise, ou l’Épreuve ridicule, comédie-ballet in two acts and in free verse, Claude Hérissant, in-8°.

Sources 
 .

External links 
 Pierre-René Lemonnier on data.bnf.fr

18th-century French dramatists and playwrights
French opera librettists
Writers from Paris
1731 births
1796 deaths